Scripturae Sacrae affectus (Devotion to Sacred Scripture) is an apostolic letter from Pope Francis published on 30 September 2020 to celebrate the 16th centenary of the death of Jerome.

See also 

Verbum Domini
 Vulgate
 Nova Vulgata
 Catholic Bible

References

External links 

 

Jerome
Documents of Pope Francis
2020 in Christianity